Furio Rendine (23 March 1920 – 22 February 1987) was an Italian composer, lyricist, producer, organizer and conductor.

Life and career 
Born in Naples, after getting a degree in law Rendine graduated in piano, harmony and composition at the  San Pietro a Majella Conservatory. In the second half of the 1940s he moved to Milan, where he was active as conductor of dance orchestras and started collaborating with EIAR.

Rendine debuted as a composer in 1947, and got his first success in 1948 with the song "A Zingarella". In 1950 he founded the record label Casa Musicale Rendine. Three of his songs won the Festival di Napoli competition: in 1957  "Malinconico Autunno", performed by Marisa Del Frate, in 1958 "Vurria", performed by Nunzio Gallo and Aurelio Fierro, and in 1966 "Bello", performed by Sergio Bruni and Robertino. He himself was artistic director of the 1961 edition of the festival, as well as organizer of numerous musical events.

He was the father of the composer Sergio Rendine.

References

External links

 

1920 births
1987 deaths
Musicians from Naples
Italian lyricists
Italian songwriters
Male songwriters
Italian record producers
Italian male conductors (music)
20th-century Italian conductors (music)
20th-century Italian male musicians